Sphaerium nucleus is a freshwater bivalve of the family Sphaeriidae. It has been often confused with Sphaerium corneum and is consequently quite poorly known.

Description
Sphaerium nucleus is a very small bivalve which may grow up to 8mm in width and length. It differs from Sphaerium corneum only in details. Like almost all bivalves, it is a filter-feeder.

Taxonomy
Sphaerium nucleus was described by Studer 1820, who placed it in the genus Cyclas. It was later thought to be a subspecies of Sphaerium corneum. Subsequently it was raised to a full species again as Sphaerium nucleus (Studer, 1820) due to its having a different form of kidney, and the shell having a broad hinge plate, dense porosity and more tumid shells with broad umbones. Unlike S. corneum  it has a preference for temporary habitats.

Distribution
S. nucleus occurs widely in Europe, from Spain to Ukraine. It appears to be absent from Russia.

 Austria
 Britain and Ireland (but see)
 Czech Republic – in Bohemia, in Moravia
 Germany
 Kyrgyzstan (but see)
 Slovakia
 Ukraine

Ecology 
This species lives in standing freshwater habitats, specifically in swampy conditions in drainage ditches and occasionally in lake margins, including temporary lakes.

References

External links
 Sphaerium nucleus at Animalbase taxonomy,short description, distribution, biology,status (threats), images 
Sphaerium nucleus  images at Encyclopedia of Life

nucleus
Molluscs of Europe
Freshwater bivalves
Bivalves described in 1820
Taxobox binomials not recognized by IUCN